A Frenchman is a French person.

Frenchman may also refer to:

Places
 Frenchman, Nevada, an unincorporated community
 Frenchman Bay, Maine
 Frenchman Bay, within King George Sound (Western Australia)
 Frenchman Butte, Saskatchewan, Canada
 Frenchman Creek (disambiguation)
 Frenchman Hills, Washington
 Frenchman Island, New York
 Frenchman Lake (California)
 Frenchman Lake (Nova Scotia), Canada
 Frenchman Lake (Yukon), Canada
 Frenchman Mountain, Nevada
 Frenchman's Pass, Aruba
 Frenchman Range, a mountain range in Nevada
 Frenchman River, Saskatchewan, Canada

Other uses
 Nap Lajoie (1874-1959), American Hall-of-Fame Major League Baseball player nicknamed "The Frenchman"
 The Merovingian, also known as "The Frenchman", a minor character in the Matrix series
 "The Frenchman", an episode of the TV series Bonanza

See also
 Scott LeDoux (1940-2011), American politician, heavyweight boxer and professional wrestler nicknamed "The Fighting Frenchman"
 Frenchmans Bluff, a summit in Minnesota
 Frenchmans Cap, a mountain in Tasmania, Australia
 Frenchman's Cay, an island in the British Virgin Islands
 Frenchman Flat, a hydrographic basin in Nevada
 Frenchman Knob, a summit in Kentucky